The 2022 Southern Utah Thunderbirds football team represented Southern Utah University in the Western Athletic Conference (WAC) during the 2022 NCAA Division I FCS football season. Led by first-year head coach DeLane Fitzgerald, the Thunderbirds played their home games at Eccles Coliseum in Cedar City, Utah. Previously a member of the Big Sky Conference for a decade, this was their first season in the WAC.

Schedule
Southern Utah and the WAC announced the 2022 football schedule on January 12, 2022.

Game summaries

St. Thomas (MN)

at No. 13 (FBS) Utah

at Western Illinois

Utah Tech

at No. 25 Eastern Kentucky

Tarleton State

at Abilene Christian

Stephen F. Austin

at Utah Tech

Lincoln (CA)

Sam Houston

References

Southern Utah Thunderbirds
Southern Utah Thunderbirds football seasons
Southern Utah Thunderbirds football